The Golden Django, named after guitarist Django Reinhardt, is an award for jazz musicians in Europe.  The trophy is a creation of the French painter Raymond Moretti.  It was first introduced in France (in 1992), then in Belgium (1995), in Sweden and Italy (1999) and finally in Denmark (2001).

Belgian palmares
Since 1995, Belgium has had its own Golden Django ceremony.  It was first proposed to reward both French-speaking and Flemish Belgian jazz musicians, but since 2000, only one musician receives the trophy, alternating French-speaking and Dutch-speaking winners each year.  The next year, they introduced the new talent award.  The ceremony was cancelled in 2004.

References
 Jazz in Belgium website

Jazz awards
Belgian music awards